Hezarrud-e Sofla (also Romanized as Hezārrūd-e Soflá) is a village in Ab Bar Rural District, in the Central District of Tarom County, Zanjan Province, Iran. At the 2006 census, its population was 617, in 132 families.

References 

Populated places in Tarom County